Valentine is an unincorporated community and census-designated place (CDP) in Mohave County, Arizona, United States. As of the 2020 census it had a population of 39. The majority of Valentine is located in a geographically isolated portion of the Hualapai Reservation.

Education
The Valentine Elementary School District serves the communities of Valentine, Truxton, Crozier and a portion of Hackberry. It has its single K-8 school in Truxton. When the school was first established, it was in Valentine itself. The Valentine Campus was closed in 1969, and classes were moved to Truxton.

The Bureau of Indian Affairs operated the Truxton Canyon Training School in Valentine from 1903 to 1937. The BIA continues to have an office in Valentine.

Demographics

Historic structures

See also

 Bullhead City, Arizona
 Fort Mohave, Arizona
 Mohave Valley, Arizona
 Yucca, Arizona
 Santa Claus, Arizona

References

Census-designated places in Mohave County, Arizona
Census-designated places in Arizona
Unincorporated communities in Mohave County, Arizona
Unincorporated communities in Arizona